Lachin Darrehsi (also Romanized as Lāchīn Darrehsī and Lachīn Darrahsī) is a village in Angut-e Gharbi Rural District, Anguti District, Germi County, Ardabil Province, Iran. At the 2006 census, its population was 144, in 33 families.

References 

Towns and villages in Germi County